Aaron Scotus, Irish abbot and musician, fl. late 10th century – 14 December 1052.

Background
Aaron was an Irish abbot and music theorist, the term Scotus at the time denoting Irish (person).

St. Martin's of Cologne
A Benedictine, Scotus was the abbot of St. Martin, Cologne, Germany in the year 1042. He pilgrimaged in his youth to Colonia to the Gaelic-Irish convent of St. Martin. He became abbot of the same in 1042. He was identified with Aaron, abbot of St. Pantaleon. Today historians reject this identification.

Work as a composer
It is believed that he first introduced the Gregorian evening service (nocturns) into Germany. He authored two historically important treaties: De utilitate cantus vocalis et de modo cantandi atque psallendi and De regulis tonorum et symphoniarum. The library of St. Martin, Cologne conserves his work Tractatum de utilitate cantus vocalis et de modo cantandi atque psallendi. He wrote three musical treatises, all of which have been lost.

Aaron died on 14 December 1052.

Bibliography
 Allgemeine Deutsche Biographie – online version
 Slonimsky, Nicolas (ed.): Baker's Biographical Dictionary of Musicians, 7th edition, New York: 1984). .
 Huglo, Michel: "Aaron Scotus", Grove Music Online, ed. L. Macy, (subscription required; retrieved on 4 September 2007).

See also

 Marianus Scotus
 Blessed Marianus Scotus
 Johannes Scotus Eriugena
 Tilmo

References

Year of birth unknown
1052 deaths
11th-century German clergy
11th-century Irish writers
11th-century scholars
11th-century Irish abbots
Irish expatriates in Germany
Irish-language singers
11th-century Latin writers
Medieval European scribes
Medieval Irish musicians